The knockout stage of the 2005–06 UEFA Champions League featured the 16 teams who finished in the top two positions in each of the eight groups in the group stage. It was played as a single-elimination tournament, with ties in the round of 16, quarter-finals and semi-finals played over two legs. The first matches of the round of 16 were played on 21 February 2006 and the final was played on 17 May 2006 at the Stade de France in Saint-Denis, near Paris, France.

Qualified teams

Bracket

Round of 16

|}

First leg

Second leg

3–3 on aggregate; Villarreal won on away goals.

4–4 on aggregate; Juventus won on away goals.

Barcelona won 3–2 on aggregate.

Milan won 5–2 on aggregate.

Lyon won 5–0 on aggregate.

Arsenal won 1–0 on aggregate.

Benfica won 3–0 on aggregate.

Internazionale won 3–2 on aggregate.

Quarter-finals

|}

First leg

Second leg

2–2 on aggregate; Villarreal won on away goals.

Milan won 3–1 on aggregate.

Barcelona won 2–0 on aggregate.

Arsenal won 2–0 on aggregate.

Semi-finals

|}

First leg

Second leg

Arsenal won 1–0 on aggregate.

Barcelona won 1–0 on aggregate.

Final

External links
 2005-06 season at UEFA website

Knockout Stage
2005-06